Taylor Corry (born 31 January 1995) is an Australian S14 swimmer. At the 2012 Summer Paralympics, she won two silver medals.

Personal
Corry was born on 31 January 1995, and grew up in Anna Bay, New South Wales. She has an intellectual disability. She attended St Philips Cristian College, Port Stephens.

Her older brother is Keiran Corry, who, like Taylor, he has represented Australia at the 2011 Global Games in swimming where he won three silver medals and one bronze.

Swimming
Corry is an S14-classified swimmer. She has been coached by Tom Davis since December 2010 a who continued to coach her going into the 2012 Summer Paralympic.

Corry started swimming in 2004. She earned three gold medals and two silver medals at the 2009 National Underage Championships. The following year, she competed in the 2010 Australian Short Course Championships.

In 2011, most days, Corry was training two hours a day, twice a day. That year, she competed in the 2011 NSW State Age Short Course Championships and 2011 New South Wales State Open Championships. She went on to compete in the 2011 Australian Underage National Championships where she earned seven gold medals. One of her gold medals came in the Girls 15–16 years 50m backstroke event, where she had a time of 34.81 seconds. Another gold medal came in the Girls 15–16 50m butterfly event where she had a time of 33.26 seconds.

Corry also competed in the 2011 Australian Short Course Championships where she set a world record for her classification in the 50-metre multi-class backstroke with a time of 31.87 seconds.

Corry made her national team debut in 2011 at the Italian hosted Global Games where she earned eight gold medals and one silver medal. The gold medals came in the 50-metre backstroke, 100-metre backstroke, 100-metre freestyle events. Her other gold medals came in relay events. Her silver medal came in the 50-metre freestyle event. In 2011, on a few days' rest following the Global Games, she competed in the Canberra hosted Australian Multi Class National championships where she earned gold medals in the 50-metre butterfly, 50-, 100-metre backstroke, 50-, 100-metre freestyle and 200-metre individual medley events. She competed at the 2012 NSW Country Championships. and then competed at the Australian National Swimming Championships, where she finished third in the 50m freestyle Multi Class event with a time of 29.16. At the 2012 Summer Paralympics, she won two silver medals in the Women's 100 m Backstroke and Women's 200 m Freestyle S14 events. and participated in a local Rotary Club fundraiser to help cover her costs to compete at the Paralympics.

Corry competing at the 2013 IPC Swimming World Championships in Montreal, Canada won a bronze medal in the Women's 200m Freestyle S14. At the 2015 IPC Swimming World Championships in Glasgow, Scotland, she won a bronze medal in the Women's 100 m Backstroke S14. She finished fourth in the Women's 200m Freestyle S14 and Women's 200m Individual Medley SM14.

Personal bests
 Personal best times as of 30 July 2012

References

External links
  (archive)
 
 
 
 

Female Paralympic swimmers of Australia
Sportswomen from New South Wales
Living people
1995 births
Australian female freestyle swimmers
Australian female backstroke swimmers
Swimmers at the 2012 Summer Paralympics
Paralympic silver medalists for Australia
Medalists at the 2012 Summer Paralympics
S14-classified Paralympic swimmers
People from the Hunter Region
Medalists at the World Para Swimming Championships
Paralympic medalists in swimming